Rutland City Public Schools is the school district that manages public schools in Rutland City, Vermont, United States.

Budget
 2019-2020 $54.7 million
 2018-2019 $52.6 million
 2009-2010 $45 million
 2008-09 $43 million
 2007-08 $40 million.

Schools
Northeast Primary 
Northwest Primary 
Rutland Intermediate School 
Rutland Middle School 
Rutland High School
RMS/RHS Allen Street Campus 
Stafford Technical Center

References

External links
 

Rutland (city), Vermont
School districts in Vermont
Education in Rutland County, Vermont
1855 establishments in Vermont
School districts established in 1855